Ivone da Conçeicão Mufuca (24 April 1972 – 10 January 2016) was an Angolan handball player.

She competed at the 2000 Summer Olympics, where Angola placed 9th.

Mufuca died on January 10, 2016, while in labour.

References

External links
 

1972 births
2016 deaths
Handball players from Luanda
Angolan female handball players
Olympic handball players of Angola
Handball players at the 2000 Summer Olympics
Deaths in childbirth